Kellinghusenstraße is a public transport railway station for the rapid transit trains of Hamburg U-Bahn lines U1 and U3. It is located in the Hamburg, Germany quarter of Eppendorf, in the borough of Hamburg-Nord.

History 
The area of Kellinghusenpark and around the station used to be owned by a Hamburg mayor, Dr. Heinrich Kellinghusen (1796 - 1879). After a station called Oderfelder Straße had originally been planned south-west of the current station, the plans were revised to include a branch line to Ohlsdorf, with the new station having four lines.

The architects for the new station were Ludwig Raabe und Otto Wöhleke, who also designed Landungsbrücken and Mundsburg stations, and the stone figures decorating the station were sculptured by Johann Michael Bossard (1874-1950).

Kellinghusenstraße station was built from 1909 to 1910 on an embankment for which some houses needed to be demolished.

When the station opened on 10 May 1912, it was a terminus for trains from Barmbeck, now Barmbek. From 25 May 1912, it was no longer a terminal, as the trains ran to Millerntor, now St. Pauli. These trains used the outer two lines of the four. The inner two lines were used from 1 December 1914, when the line from Kellinghusenstraße to Ohlsdorf was opened, and the station was a terminus for that line until 2 June 1929, when the line was extended to Stephansplatz. In the meantime, in 1926, a bridge designed by Walther Puritz was built between the two platforms at the south end after they had been lengthened from 60 to 90 meters.

Location 
The station is close to the 1914-built art deco Holthusenbad swimming baths and to Kellinghusenpark, and is on the corner of Kellinghusenstraße and Goernerstraße.

Station layout 
The station is on an embankment with two island platforms, joined by a bridge at the south end. There is an exit at its north end on the corner of Kellinghusenstraße and Goernerstraße, with steps and elevators leading to each platform. On the entrance level is a shop, which also sells tickets, but no lockerboxes. No personnel attends the station but there are ticket machines, CCTV, and emergency and information telephones.

Service  
Kellinghusenstraße is served by Hamburg U-Bahn lines U1 and U3; departures are every 5 minutes.

See also 

 Hamburger Verkehrsverbund (Public transport association for the Hamburg area)
 Hamburger Hochbahn (Operator of the Hamburg U-Bahn)

References

External links

 Line and route network plans at hvv.de 

Hamburg U-Bahn stations in Hamburg
Buildings and structures in Hamburg-Nord
U1 (Hamburg U-Bahn) stations
U3 (Hamburg U-Bahn) stations
Railway stations opened in 1912
1912 establishments in Germany